Cerro Ramada is a mountain in the Cordillera de la Ramada range of the Andes, in Argentina.

The first ascent of the mountain was by a Polish expedition in 1934, when a cairn was erected on the summit. In 2013 German climber Florian Hill opened up a direct route on the northwest face of Cerro Ramada.

References

See also
List of mountains in the Andes

Ramada, Cerro
Six-thousanders of the Andes